Dark Dragon may refer to:

The Dark Dragon, a fictional character in the TV series American Dragon: Jake Long
Dark Dragon, a fictional character in the video game Shining Force
Dark Dragon (wrestler), Japanese professional wrestler
Dark Dragon (luchador), Mexican professional wrestler